Anna Maria Ortese (June 13, 1914 – March 9, 1998) was an Italian author of novels, short stories, poetry, and travel writing. Born in Rome, she grew up between southern Italy and Tripoli, with her formal education ending at age thirteen. Her first book, Angelici dolori, was issued in 1937. In 1953 her third collection, Il mare non bagna Napoli, won the coveted Viareggio Prize; thereafter, Ortese's stories, novels, and journalism received many of the most distinguished Italian literary awards, including the Strega and the Fiuggi. Although she lived for many years in Naples following the Second World War, she also resided in Milan, in Rome, and for most of the last twenty years of her life in Rapallo. L'iguana, Ortese’s best known work in English translation, was published in 1987 as The Iguana by the American literary press McPherson & Company.

Early life 
Born in Rome, she was the fifth of six children born to Beatrice Vaccà and Oreste Ortese. Her father worked for the Italian government, and the family moved frequently. In January 1933, her brother, Emmanuel, with whom she was very close, died in Martinique, where his ship had docked. His death drove her to write.

Career 
Her first poems were published in the magazine La Sierra Lettering. Her work was well-received, and she was encouraged to write further. The following year, the same magazine published her first short story, La Pellerossa. In 1937, Massimo Bontempelli, writer for La Bompiani and Ortese's mentor, published another of her short stories, Angelici dolori. Although this story received favorable reviews, it drew criticism from prominent literary critics Falqui and Vigorelli.

Despite her promising start, her inspiration and motivation waned. In 1939, she traveled from Florence to Venice, where she found employment as a proofreader with the local newspaper Il Gazzetino. With World War II approaching, Ortese returned to Naples, where she had once lived with her family. It was there that she was once again inspired to write. At the end of the war, Anna worked as a writer for the magazine Sud.

Her parents died in 1950 and 1953. During this time, she published her second and third books: L'Infanta sepolta and Il mare non bagna Napoli. The latter consisted of five pieces which depicted the abject conditions of Naples following the war; it became highly acclaimed and was awarded the Viareggio Prize. It is from the collection's first chapter that the movie Un paio di occhiali was adapted and presented at the Venice Biennale in 2001.

From the mid-1950s to the late 60s, Anna traveled and wrote extensively. She returned to Milan in 1967 and wrote a book, Poveri e semplici, for which she was awarded the Strega Prize.

In her later years, Ortese became more isolated until the age of seventy-five, when she moved Rapallo to live with her sister. At the age of 80, she began corresponding with Beppe Costa, who encouraged her to publish Il treno russo. Soon after, Anna accepted the proposal to republish many of her earlier novels. One, L'iguana, was translated into English by McPherson & Company in 1987, and into French by Gallimard in 1988. (An Italian feature film of L'iguana, directed by Catherine McGilvray, was released in 2004.) Another, Il cardillo addolorato, topped the Italian fiction list. In 1987, a collection of her short stories, A Music Behind the Wall: Selected Stories, was published.

Death 
She died peacefully at the age of 84 in her home in Rapallo in March 1998. Only after her death did her work receive international recognition and praise.

Awards 

 Viareggio Prize 1953 for Il mare non bagna Napoli
 Strega Prize 1967 for Poveri e semplici
 Fiuggi Prize 1986 for L'iguana
 Procida-Elsa Morante Prize 1998 for In Sonno e in Veglia
 Prix du Meilleur Livre Étranger 1998 for the French edition of Il Cardillo Adolorato (la Douleur du chardonneret)

Bibliography

Novels 
 L'iguana (1965)

 Poveri e semplici (1967)
 Il porto di Toledo (1975)
 Il cappello piumato (1979)
 Il cardillo addolorato (1993)
 
 Alonso e i visionari (1996)

Short stories 

 Angelici dolori (1937) 
 L'Infanta sepolta (1950) 
 Il mare non bagna Napoli (1953)

 I giorni del cielo (1958)
 La luna sul muro e altri racconti (1968)
 L'alone grigio (1969)
 Estivi terrori (1987)
 La morte del Folletto (1987)
 In sonno e in veglia (1987)
 Il monaciello di Napoli - Il fantasma (2002) - stories originally published between 1940 and 1942
 Mistero doloroso (2010) - previously unpublished stories

Two volumes of her selected short stories, translated by Henry Martin and published under the collective title A Music Behind the Wall, appeared in 1994 and 1998 from McPherson & Company.

Essays and travel writing 

 Silenzio a Milano (1958) - articles published in the 1950s
 Il treno russo (1983) - reportage 
 Il mormorio di Parigi (1986) - articles published around 1961
 La lente scura. Scritti di viaggio (1991) - travel writings
 Le giacchette grigie della Nunziatella - articles from 1945-1947
 Corpo celeste (1997) - writings from 1974 to 1989
 Da Moby Dick all'Orsa Bianca (2011) - writings on literature and art, published between 1939 and 1994
 Le Piccole Persone (2016) - in defence of animals and other writings, some previously unpublished

Notes

References 
 Reed, Cosetta S. "Biography: Ortese, Anna Maria," N.p., 2004.
 "Anna Maria Ortese", The Times Literary Supplement, 29 January 1970.

Further reading 
Anna Maria Ortese: Celestial Geographies, ed. Gian Maria Annovi and Flora Ghezzo (University of Toronto Press, 2015)
Vilma De Gasperin, Loss and the Other in the Visionary Work of Anna Maria Ortese (University of Oxford Press, 2014)

1914 births
1998 deaths
Italian women poets
Writers from Rome
20th-century Italian poets
20th-century Italian women writers